Spodnja Sorica is a village in the Municipality of Železniki in the Upper Carniola region of Slovenia.

It is the birthplace of the Slovene Impressionist painter Ivan Grohar. The house in which he was born stands in the middle of the village and holds a small collection of items associated with Grohar and an ethnographic collection as well as a gallery.

Church

The local church is dedicated to Saint Nicholas. It also contains some of Grohar's early paintings, and there is a statue of Grohar nearby.

References

External links
 Spodnja Sorica at Geopedia

Populated places in the Municipality of Železniki